The double grave accent (  ̏ ) is a diacritic used in scholarly discussions of the Serbo-Croatian and sometimes Slovene languages. It is also used in the International Phonetic Alphabet.

In Serbo-Croatian and Slovenian, double grave accent is used to indicate a short falling tone, though in discussion of Slovenian, a single grave accent is also often used for this purpose. The double grave accent is found in both Latin and Cyrillic; however, it is not used in the everyday orthography of either language, only in discussions of the phonology of these languages.

In the International Phonetic Alphabet, the double grave accent is used to indicate extra-low tone.

The letters a e i o r u and their Cyrillic equivalents а е и о р у can all be found with the double grave accent. Unicode provides precomposed characters for the uppercase and the lowercase Latin letters but not the Cyrillic letters. The Cyrillic letters can be formed using the combining character for the double grave, which is located at U+030F. The combining character can also be used with IPA vowel symbols, if necessary.

Letters with double grave

Unicode

See also
Grave accent
Double acute accent
Inverted breve
Izhitsa, a Cyrillic letter with a form that visually resembles a double grave accent
IPA

References

Latin-script diacritics
Phonetic transcription symbols
Cyrillic-script diacritics